Robert George Richardson (January 3, 1928 – December 5, 2005) was an American fashion photographer. Richardson was born in Long Island, New York, to an Irish Catholic family. Originally a graphic designer in New York City, Richardson did not pick up a camera until age 35. His rise to fashion fame was swift, although not without some battle on his part:

Richardson developed a reputation for being very difficult to work with. He brought his personal life, which was tumultuous, into his art. He battled with bouts of schizophrenia throughout his life. After making it to the top of the often catty and vicious world of fashion, getting paid up to $15,000 for a single image, he succumbed to his illness and ended up homeless on the streets of San Francisco. In 1989, an art historian researching fashion photography tracked Richardson down living in a flophouse, opening the door to Richardson's reestablishing contact with his son and eventually returning to New York City, where with the help of Richard Avedon and Steven Meisel, he was able to obtain teaching positions at International Center for Photography and the School of Visual Arts. Richardson restarted his career in his sixties, once again working for such magazines as Italian Vogue and British GQ.

He was the father of photographer Terry Richardson and Margaret "Meg" Richardson (9/30/1957-5/8/2015).

References

1928 births
2005 deaths
20th-century American photographers
Fashion photographers